Women parks are women-only amusement parks. These are sites prominent in Islamic cities. Men and boys are not allowed to enter.

History
The first women park was established in Helena, Montana in 1913, the first one in Iran was established in Borujerd in 2000s.

By country

Iran
In different cities there are amusement parks where men are not allowed to enter with the aim of sex segragtion. Masoumeh Ebtekar has said that establishing these parks is a national essential. These parks are in many big and small cities in the country, such as:
 Tehran (5 women parks; namely, Behesht-e-madran, Pardis-e-Banovan, Boostan-e-Narges, Shahrbanoo Complex, Reyhane park)
 Shiraz
 Esfahan
 Mashhad
 Tabriz
 Nowshahr
 Bandar Abbas
 Rasht
 Kerman
 Marand
Founded in 2008, Behesht-e-madran is the first women-only park of Tehran. Shahrbanoo Complex (also called Velayat) is another women-only park in Tehran. It includes recreation and sport facilities just for females. Reyhane park is in fact part of Chitgar Park separated only for women including 18 ha.

Pakistan
In 2012 a women's park called Fatima Jinnah was established in Lahore with walls 7 feet in height. Authorities have promised to establish 10 more others.

Saudi Arabia
The first female-only trampoline park was established by Bounce in the capital of Saudi Arabia, in 2018.

References

Sex segregation
Women-only spaces